Minuscule 645 (in the Gregory-Aland numbering), ε 434 (von Soden), is a Greek minuscule manuscript of the New Testament, on parchment. It is dated by a colophon to the year 1304 (or 1305). The manuscript has complex contents. Scrivener labelled it by 591e.

Description 

The codex contains the text of the four Gospels, on 279 parchment leaves (size ). It is written in one column per page, 22 lines per page.

The Ammonian Sections were added by a later hand.

The Pericope Adulterae (John 7:53-8:11) is marked with an obelus.

Text 

The Greek text of the codex is a representative of the Byzantine text-type. Hermann von Soden classified it to the textual family Kr. Kurt Aland placed it in Category V.
According to the Claremont Profile Method it represents Kr in Luke 1 and Luke 20. In Luke 10 no profile was made.

History 

The manuscript was written by Neophytus a monk of Cyprus in 1304/1305. It was held in the monastery in Creta. In 1849 it belonged to Micheal Sarmalenios in Milos. It was bought at Milos by H. O. Coxe in 1857 from a Greek who had it from a relative who had been "hegoumenos" of a Canadian monastery.

A facsimile was given in Catalogue of British Museum.

The manuscript currently is housed at the British Library (Add MS 22506) in London.

See also 

 List of New Testament minuscules
 Biblical manuscript
 Textual criticism

References

Further reading 
 A. Turyn, Dated Greek Manuscripts of the Thirteenth and Fourteenth Centuries in the Libraries of Great Britain, Dumbarton Oaks Series XVII (Washington, D.C. 1980), 46, p. 67
 Facsimiles of Manuscripts and Inscriptions, ed. E. A. Bond, E. M. Thompson and others, I (London 1873-1883), 205

Greek New Testament minuscules
14th-century biblical manuscripts
British Library additional manuscripts